Capperia fletcheri is a moth of the family Pterophoridae. It is found in Israel and the Palestinian Territories.

The wingspan is about 16 mm. Adults are dark brown in colour.

References

Moths described in 1951
Oxyptilini